INTELSAT 34 or IS-34 is communications satellite built on Space Systems/Loral's 1300-series satellite platform. The satellite broadcasts television to homes in Brazil, distributes video programming for companies like HBO and Fox across Latin America, and beams Internet broadband services to travelers aboard airplanes and ships crossing the North Atlantic Ocean.

The satellite has 22 C-band channels to provide services to North and South America and Europe and 18 Ku-band channels for services to Mexico, Central America, Brazil, the Caribbean, Europe, a portion of the United States, and the northern part of the Atlantic Ocean. Intelsat 34, unlike its predecessor, does not include the UHF-band that Intelsat had been unable to sell to its intended customer, the U.S. Department of Defense.

Launch 
Intelsat 34 is the 50th Loral-built satellite launched for Intelsat. With a launch mass of 7,275 pounds - about 3.3 metric tons - Intelsat 34 is a replacement for the Intelsat 27 spacecraft lost aboard a Sea Launch mission in 2013.  It took over service from the Galaxy 11 and Intelsat 805 spacecraft in orbit, the company's last two relay stations that had been launched before 2000.

References

External links 

Communications satellites in geostationary orbit
Spacecraft launched in 2015
Intelsat satellites
Satellites using the SSL 1300 bus
Spacecraft launched by Ariane rockets